The tzimtzum or tsimtsum (Hebrew   "contraction/constriction/condensation") is a term used in the Lurianic Kabbalah to explain Isaac Luria's doctrine that God began the process of creation by "contracting" his Ohr Ein Sof (infinite light) in order to allow for a "conceptual space" in which finite and seemingly independent realms could exist. This primordial initial contraction, forming a ḥālāl happānuy "vacant space" into which new creative light could beam, is denoted by general reference to the tzimtzum. In Kabbalistic interpretation, tzimtzum gives rise to the paradox of simultaneous divine presence and absence within the vacuum and resultant Creation.

Function
Because the tzimtzum results in the "empty space" in which spiritual and physical Worlds and ultimately, free will can exist, God is often referred to as "Ha-Makom" ( lit. "the Place", "the Omnipresent") in Rabbinic literature ("He is the Place of the World, but the World is not His Place"). 
Relatedly, Olam — the Hebrew for "World/Realm" — is derived from the root עלם meaning "concealment". This etymology is complementary with the concept of Tzimtzum in that the subsequent spiritual realms and the ultimate physical universe conceal to different degrees the infinite spiritual lifeforce of creation. 

Their progressive diminutions of the divine Ohr (Light) from realm to realm in creation are also referred to in the plural as secondary tzimtzumim (innumerable "condensations/veilings/constrictions" of the lifeforce). However, these subsequent concealments are found in earlier, Medieval Kabbalah. The new doctrine of Luria advanced the notion of the primordial withdrawal (a dilug – radical "leap") in order to reconcile a causal creative chain from the Infinite with finite Existence.

Inherent paradox

A commonly held understanding in Kabbalah is that the concept of tzimtzum contains a built-in paradox, requiring that God be simultaneously transcendent and immanent. 
Viz.:
On the one hand, if the "Infinite" did not restrict itself, then nothing could exist—everything would be overwhelmed by God's totality. Existence thus requires God's transcendence, as above. 
On the other hand, God continuously maintains the existence of, and is thus not absent from, the created universe.

Rabbi Nachman of Breslav discusses this inherent paradox as follows:

Science and Kabbalah

The fundamental difference between modern science and traditional Kabbalah is the "post-Aristotelian scientific doctrine" about that space would be first created while in the Jewish religion of the Bible the faith considers that light was created before anything else.

Lurianic thought

Isaac Luria introduced four central themes into kabbalistic thought, tzimtzum, Shevirat HaKelim (the shattering of the vessels), Tikkun (repair), and Partzufim. These four are a group of interrelated, and continuing, processes. Tzimtzum describes the first step in the process by which God began the process of creation by withdrawing his own essence from an area, creating an area in which creation could begin and where he could exist as reshimu (residue) in all emptiness. Shevirat HaKelim describes how, after the tzimtzum, God created the vessels (HaKelim) in the empty space, and how when God began to pour his Light into the vessels they were not strong enough to hold the power of God's Light and shattered (Shevirat). The third step, Tikkun, is the process of gathering together, and raising, the sparks of God's Light that were carried down with the shards of the shattered vessels.

Since tzimtzum is connected to the concept of exile, and Tikkun is connected to the need to repair the problems of the world of human existence, Luria unites the cosmology of Kabbalah with the practice of Jewish ethics, and makes ethics and traditional Jewish religious observance the means by which God allows humans to complete and perfect the material world through living the precepts of a traditional Jewish life.
Thus, in contrast to earlier, Medieval Kabbalah, this made the first creative act a concealment/divine exile rather than unfolding revelation. This dynamic crisis-catharsis in the divine flow is repeated throughout the Lurianic scheme.

Chabad view
In Chabad Hassidism the concept of tzimtzum is understood as not meant to be interpreted literally, but rather to refer to the manner in which God impresses his presence upon the consciousness of finite reality:  thus tzimtzum is not only seen as being a real process but is also seen as a doctrine that every person is able, and indeed required, to understand and meditate upon.

In the Chabad view, the function of the tzimtzum was "to conceal from created beings the activating force within them, enabling them to exist as tangible entities, instead of being utterly nullified within their source". The tzimtzum produced the required "vacated space" (chalal panui , chalal ), devoid of direct awareness of God's presence.

Vilna Gaon's view
The Vilna Gaon held that tzimtzum was not literal, however, the "upper unity", the fact that the universe is only illusory, and that tzimtzum was only figurative, was not perceptible, or even really understandable, to those not fully initiated in the mysteries of Kabbalah.

Others say that Vilna Gaon held the literal view of the tzimzum.

Shlomo Elyashiv articulates this view clearly (and claims that not only is it the opinion of the Vilna Gaon, but also is the straightforward and simple reading of Luria and is the only true understanding).

He writes:

However, the Gaon and Elyashiv held that tzimtzum only took place in God's will (Ratzon), but that it is impossible to say anything at all about God himself (Atzmus). Thus, they did not actually believe in a literal tzimtzum in God's essence.  Luria's Etz Chaim itself, however, in the First Shaar, is ambivalent: in one place it speaks of a literal tzimtzum in God's essence and self, then it changes a few lines later to a tzimtzum in the divine light (an emanated, hence created and not part of God's self, energy).

History and Hester Panim

In the modern era, Shoah has been the subject of discussion about theological thinking: the Hester Panim is a part of modern exegesis. Tzimtzum is a process before Creation but during history the same "structure" is even present, as modern philosophy like to know. The characteristic of Shoah is part of individual life and a part of this structure of history:

Application in clinical psychology
An Israeli professor, Mordechai Rotenberg, believes  the Kabbalistic-Hasidic tzimtzum paradigm has significant implications for clinical therapy. According to this paradigm, God's "self-contraction" to vacate space for the world serves as a model for human behavior and interaction. The tzimtzum model promotes a unique community-centric approach which contrasts starkly with the language of Western psychology.

In popular culture
Tsimtsum is central to the plot of Aryeh Lev Stollman's 1997 novel The Far Euphrates.

Tzimtzum is mentioned as a topic of fascination for Nahman Samuel ben Levi of Busk and his friend Leybko in Olga Tokarczuk's novel The Books of Jacob.

"Tsim Tsum" is the title of a collection of vignettes by Sabrina Orah Mark (published 2009). 

In Yann Martel's novel Life of Pi and its 2012 film adaptation, a cargo ship called the Tsimtsum sinks at a pivotal point of the plot. The story deals with the existence or non-existence of a divine power, and the sinking of the ship marks the creation of the universe in the novel's allegory.

See also
 Acosmism
 Apeiron (cosmology)
 Big Bounce
 Inflation (cosmology)
 Monism
 Nondualism

Notes

References
 Jacob Immanuel Schochet, Mystical Concepts in Chassidism, especially chapter II, Kehot 1979,3rd revised edition 1988. 
 Aryeh Kaplan, "Paradoxes", in "The Aryeh Kaplan Reader", Artscroll 1983. 
 Aryeh Kaplan, "Innerspace",  Moznaim Pub. Corp. 1990. 
 Aryeh Kaplan Understanding God , Ch2. in "The Handbook of Jewish Thought", Moznaim 1979.

External links
 Tzimtzum: A Primer, chabad.org
 Tanya, Shaar HaYichud VehaEmunah Shneur Zalman of Liadi—see Lessons in Tanya, chabad.org
 Shaar HaYichud - The Gate of Unity , Dovber Schneuri — a detailed explanation of the concept of Tzimtzum.
 Veyadaata - To Know G-d, Sholom Dovber Schneersohn, a Hasidic discourse on the paradox of Tzimtzum
 inner.org, "Basics in Kabbalah and Chassidut"
 Tanya: Tzimtzum and armony of economy in the world with Tzedakah (www.chabad.org)

Jewish mysticism
Kabbalistic words and phrases
Isaac Luria